In enzymology, a 1,4-alpha-glucan 6-alpha-glucosyltransferase is an enzyme that catalyzes the chemical reaction that transfers an alpha-D-glucosyl residue in a 1,4-alpha-D-glucan to the primary hydroxyl group of glucose or 1,4-alpha-D-glucan.

This enzyme belongs to the family of glycosyltransferases, specifically the hexosyltransferases.  The systematic name of this enzyme class is 1,4-alpha-D-glucan:1,4-alpha-D-glucan(D-glucose) 6-alpha-D-glucosyltransferase. Other names in common use include oligoglucan-branching glycosyltransferase, 1,4-alpha-D-glucan 6-alpha-D-glucosyltransferase, T-enzyme, and D-glucosyltransferase.

References 

 
 
 

EC 2.4.1
Enzymes of unknown structure